Sung-Ki Jung (born August 6, 1979) is a baseball pitcher who currently plays for the NC Dinos in the Korea Baseball Organization.

Personal life and name
Jung was born in Yeosu, South Korea. He attended Soonchun High School.

His name has been spelled numerous ways. He has also been known as Sung Jung and Jeong Seong-Ki.

Professional career
Jung was signed by the Atlanta Braves of Major League Baseball and played in their minor league system from 2002 to 2003 and from 2007 to 2008. He did not play from 2004 to 2006 because he was serving mandatory military time in his home country. In his four-year career, he posted a 3-8 won-loss record and had 47 saves and a 2.70 ERA in 143 games. In 180 1/3 innings, he had 201 strikeouts.

He joined the NC Dinos in 2012, when it was still a member of the Korea Baseball Futures League. The Dinos joined the Korea Baseball Championship in 2013. Jung made 5 relief appearances for NC that year, posting a 3.86 ERA with a 0-0 record.

References

Living people
People from Yeosu
1979 births
NC Dinos players
Rome Braves players
Myrtle Beach Pelicans players
Mississippi Braves players
Minor league baseball players